The Bishop's School  may refer to:

The Bishop's School (La Jolla), in La Jolla, California
The Bishop's School (Pune), in Pune, India
Bishop's School (Ranchi), in Ranchi, Jharkhand, India